Daniel Mark Woodards (born 8 October 1983) is an English footballer who last played as a defender for  club Boreham Wood. He previously played in the Football League for Crewe Alexandra, Milton Keynes Dons, Bristol Rovers and Tranmere Rovers.

Club career

Early career
Woodards was born in Forest Gate, London. He began his career as a trainee with Chelsea, playing 70 times plus 10 substitute appearances (scoring 8 goals) for the reserve team in the period 2000–01 to 2004–05, but was released during the summer of 2005 without making a senior appearance for the club.

Exeter City
After spending a short time on trial with League Two club Wycombe Wanderers, he signed on non-contract terms for Conference National club Exeter City on 29 October 2005. Woodards was able to impress manager Alex Inglethorpe enough to secure a contract through the 2006–07 season.

During his time with Exeter, Woodards proved himself to be a versatile and talented player. Able to play both as a right-back and right-sided winger, he quickly established himself as Exeter's first choice right-back.

Crewe Alexandra
After rejecting a series of new contracts from Exeter during the 2006–07 season, Woodards had a trial with League One club Yeovil Town during the January transfer window. Glovers manager Russell Slade was reportedly interested in signing the English defender, but it was Dario Gradi of fellow League One side Crewe Alexandra who managed to sign Woodards for a fee of £30,000 and a 20% sell-on clause.

MK Dons
He signed a two-year deal at MK Dons after his contract expired. He was released at the end of the 2010–11 season after turning down a new contract. His only goal for MK Dons came in a 2–1 win at Walsall on 7 August 2010.

Bristol Rovers
Woodards signed for Bristol Rovers on 26 August 2011 on a one-year deal, making his debut in the League Cup 2nd Round away to Leyton Orient. He made his league debut in a 4–1 defeat at Crawley Town on 3 September, and scored his first goal against AFC Totton in the FA Cup. Woodards 'signalled interest' in signing a contract extension at Bristol Rovers on 12 June 2012, an extra year being added to his previous one-year deal.

Tranmere Rovers
After a successful trial at Tranmere, Woodards signed on an initial six-month deal on 28 July 2014 and was allocated squad number 17.

Boreham Wood
After leaving Tranmere, Woodards signed for newly promoted National League club Boreham Wood in July 2015. Woodards was released by the club at the end of the 2020–21 season.

Career statistics

References

External links

1983 births
People from Forest Gate
Living people
Association football defenders
English footballers
England semi-pro international footballers
Chelsea F.C. players
Exeter City F.C. players
Crewe Alexandra F.C. players
Milton Keynes Dons F.C. players
Bristol Rovers F.C. players
Tranmere Rovers F.C. players
Boreham Wood F.C. players
English Football League players
National League (English football) players